Brahmasri Samavedam Shanmukha Sarma (born 16 May 1967) is an Indian spiritual teacher, known for his appearances on television in India, and for his commentary and discourses on Rudra Namakam, Vishnu Sahasranamam, Sivanandalahari, Soundarya Lahari, Lalitha Sahasranamam, Siva Tatvam, Ganapathi Tatwam, Sri Krishna Tatwam, Ramayanam, Bhagavatam, the Bhagavad Gita, Mahabharatham, Dakshinamurti Tattvam, Sutha Samhitha, Aditya Hrdayam and the kritis of different Vaggeyakaras.

Early life
Sri Samavedam Shanmukha Sarma was born to Sri Samavedam Rama Murthy Sarma and Smt. Ramanamma in 1967, in Asika, Orissa. He completed his B. A. (Hons) in Economics from Berhampur University.  He joined as a sub-editor for Swathi weekly magazine.

Teaching
As Sarma was brought up in a scholarly family, he learned shastras and kavya vachanas from several gurus. Dedicating his life to more metaphysical matters, he now tours the State giving discourses and lectures with Hyderabad as his base. His first lecture was on 'Agni' at the Sivaramakrishna kshetram in Vijayawada.

He has been giving religious discourses, lectures on Vedic values and Itihasas, in Andhra Pradesh and other parts of India. He has toured in the US, UK and Australia, and given lectures on Hindu scriptures, and on Indian cultural heritage.

Sarma regards Swami Vivekananda as one of his inspirations.

Discourses 
Sarma has discoursed on a variety of topics and provided explanation to complex topics relating to Hinduism. Some of the pravachanams are listed here, along with locations, date (not in any specific order):

 Adi Sankara Virichita Prasnnotara Malika, MI, 12 July 2016, 13 July 2016.
 Aparoshanubhuti (Adi Sankara's works), Neredmet, Hyderabad, 27 April 2017,
 Unity in Diversity in Hinduism, NTR Gardens, Hyderabad, 14 November 2018.
 Sri Rama Raksha, Sivatandava Strotram, Boston, 19 May 2019, 27 May 2019.
During visit to USA tour between May 2022 to August 2022-  Sarma garu spoke on a variety of topics including Ramayana, Mahabharata, and other aspects of Hinduism.

With a view to bring knowledge of Vedic Shastras in a style that can be understood by many people, Sri Sarma started a monthly magazine called Rushipeetham.

Sivapadam 
Sarma started a lyric-writing career relatively much later than the contemporary writers. He has written more than 1000 Sivapadam songs on expressing devotion and philosophy on various topics of Hinduism. Sivapadam kirtanaas were released to the public in the form of books, programs, cassettes and CDs.

Sarma started an online university in 2021, offering courses related to Bhagavad Gita, and other Hindu scriptures.

Awards and recognition 
Sarma was awarded “Samanvaya Saraswathi”; “Aarsha Dharmopanyasa Kesari”; “Vaagdevi Varaputhra”.

On 7 November 2021, he was awarded the title of 'Dharmika Varenyam' (loosely translates to Utmost holder of Dharma).

On 15 September 2015 he received a Mallapragada Sri Ranga Rao Award for his work.

20 January 2014, Bharathi Thyagaraja Samman, in the presence of Dr V.R.Gowrishankar CEO & Administrator,Sri Sharada Peetham,Sringeri

References

External links
 Official website
 Rushipeetham 
 https://rushipeetham.org/
 https://rushividyabhyasam.org/
 https://sivapadam.org/

Telugu people
Scholars of Hinduism
Living people
1967 births